ITTF may refer to:

 Information Technology Task Force, a body supporting ICT standardisation
 International Table Tennis Federation, an international sports governing body for all national table tennis associations